Northmavine or Northmaven (meaning ‘the land north of the Mavis Grind’) is a peninsula in northwest Mainland Shetland in Scotland. The peninsula has historically formed the civil parish Northmavine. The modern Northmavine community council area has the same extent. The area of the parish is given as 204.1 km2.

Summary
Northmavine is in the north west of the island, and contains the villages of Hillswick, Ollaberry, and North Roe.

An isthmus, Mavis Grind, about a hundred yards across, forms the sole connection with the rest of Mainland. The coast is indented by numerous bays and consists largely of high, steep rocks. It has a number of high, fissured, cavernous cliffs on the west coast and consists of many skerries, islets, and offshore rocks. The interior has a very small amount of arable land; it consists mostly of rough, rising ground, including Ronas Hill, the highest point in all Shetland.

Esha Ness Lighthouse is situated on the Northmavine peninsula. Tangwick Haa Museum preserves the history of Northmavine. Remains of ancient watch houses and remains of barrows and forts are also numerous.

Notable people

William Jack (principal) born and raised here

Population
At the provisional population census conducted in March 2017, the population numbered 741, yielding a population density of 3.6 per km2, which is the second lowest in Shetland, after Fetlar.

Note
This article incorporates text from  Wilson, Rev. John The Gazetteer of Scotland (Edinburgh, 1882) Published by W. & A.K. Johnstone.

References

Related reading
Guy, Peter  (2006) Northmavine (Walking the Coastline of Shetland) (Shetland Times Ltd)

External links
Northmavine Up Helly Aa
History Tangwick Haa Museum

 
Parishes of Shetland
Neolithic Scotland
Neolithic settlements
Mainland, Shetland